Fabien Niederhäuser (born 15 July 1961) is a retired Swiss hurdler.

He competed at the 1987 World Championships and the 1990 European Championships without reaching the final.

References

1961 births
Living people
Swiss male hurdlers
World Athletics Championships athletes for Switzerland